Olé ala Lee is a 1961 album by Peggy Lee that was arranged by Joe Harnell.

Track listing
"Come Dance with Me" (Sammy Cahn, Jimmy Van Heusen) - 2:28
"By Myself" (Howard Dietz, Arthur Schwartz) - 3:20
"You're So Right for Me" (Jay Livingston, Ray Evans) - 1:47
"Just Squeeze Me (But Please Don't Tease Me)" (Duke Ellington, Lee Gaines) - 1:54
"Fantástico" (Jack Keller, Noel Sherman) - 2:05
"Together (Wherever We Go)" (Jule Styne, Stephen Sondheim) - 1:46
"Love and Marriage" (Cahn, Van Heusen) - 2:07
"Non Dimenticar" (Shelley Dobbins, Michele Galdieri, Gino Redi) - 2:26
"From Now On" (Cole Porter) - 1:55
"You Stepped Out of a Dream" (Nacio Herb Brown, Gus Kahn) - 2:30
"Olé" (Peggy Lee) - 2:26
"I Can't Resist You" (Ned Meyer, Will Donaldson) - 2:10

Personnel
 Peggy Lee - vocals
 Joe Harnell - arranger, conductor

References

1961 albums
Peggy Lee albums
Albums produced by Dave Cavanaugh
Capitol Records albums
Albums conducted by Joe Harnell
Albums arranged by Joe Harnell
Albums recorded at Capitol Studios